Andriy Viktorovych Parkhomenko (born 27 December 1971) is a Ukrainian football coach and a former player.

He has a son Kostyantyn Parkhomenko and a brother Dmytro Parkhomenko who also play for Balkany.

External links
 

1971 births
Living people
Footballers from Odesa
Soviet footballers
FC Elektrometalurh-NZF Nikopol players
Ukrainian footballers
SC Odesa players
Ukrainian expatriate footballers
Expatriate footballers in Azerbaijan
Ukrainian expatriate sportspeople in Azerbaijan
Expatriate footballers in Russia
Ukrainian expatriate sportspeople in Russia
FC Akhmat Grozny players
FC Sakhalin Yuzhno-Sakhalinsk players
Ukrainian Premier League players
SC Tavriya Simferopol players
FC Podillya Khmelnytskyi players
FC Nyva Ternopil players
FC SKA-Lotto Odesa players
FC Chornomorets Odesa players
Expatriate footballers in Bulgaria
Ukrainian expatriate sportspeople in Bulgaria
FC Botev Vratsa players
Expatriate footballers in Moldova
Ukrainian expatriate sportspeople in Moldova
FC Sheriff Tiraspol players
CS Tiligul-Tiras Tiraspol players
FC Tiraspol players
FC Ivan Odesa players
FC Hoverla Uzhhorod players
FC Palmira Odesa players
Ukrainian football managers
Ukrainian expatriate football managers
Expatriate football managers in Russia
FC Ivan Odesa managers
FC Dnister Ovidiopol managers
FC Balkany Zorya managers
FC Real Pharma Odesa managers
Association football defenders
Neftçi PFK players